Genesys may refer to:

 Genesys (company), a customer experience and contact center technology company
 Genesys (video game), an educational video game released in 2000
 Genesys (website), a portal to information about plant genetic resources for food and agriculture
 Genesys, a brand of music synthesizers produced by Generalmusic
 Genesys Wealth Advisers or Avanti Racing Team, an Australian UCI Continental cycling team

See also

 Timewyrm: Genesys (novel) 1991 Doctor Who story by John Peel
 Genesis (disambiguation)
 Genisys (disambiguation)